StepTalk is the official GNUstep scripting language framework that represents separate scriptable servers or applications as a single object environment. It is meant to be independent of the programming language used. Its default language is Smalltalk running on an Objective-C runtime.

StepTalk was ported to Mac OS X.

Introduction 
The goal of StepTalk is to provide an environment for gluing applications together and to provide a framework for communication between users and objects in the applications. Other major goals are:

 Simple and quick extensions of applications or tools
 Batch-processing of objects in applications or tools
 Fast prototyping of applications or new application features; play and tune a concept in a reactive interpreted environment

The default scripting language in StepTalk is Smalltalk. This is because Smalltalk is a very simple language and is easy to learn. There are just a few basic principles that a user must know to be able to use the language, and it is similar to a natural language. Smalltalk uses a similar approach to that of Objective-C, the language used in GNUstep.

Platforms 
StepTalk works on any platform on which GNUstep works. Ports to native macOS Cocoa framework are being developed by various contributors.

See also 
 AppleScript
 Object-oriented programming

External links
 

Scripting languages
Smalltalk programming language family
Dynamically typed programming languages
GNUstep